NGC 368 is a lenticular galaxy in the constellation of Phoenix. It was discovered by John Herschel on September 5, 1834.

References

0368
Lenticular galaxies
Phoenix (constellation)
Astronomical objects discovered in 1834
003826